Goulfey is a town and commune in the Logone-et-Chari department of Cameroon, close to the border of Chad.

Geography
Goulfey is located about 50 kilometres north of Kousséri and is separated by the Logone River.

History
Goulfey is infamous for its practice and techniques of warfare. It was believed to have been founded by Rabat after Djagara led a victory over him with the help of the French.

The history of Goulfey has its from the 16th to 18th centuries during its Arab invasions.

The Arabs found people embedded in ancestral traditions, locally known as the cult of the Varan, which is considered the symbol of Goulfey and a spiritual element of protection and divination. It plays an important political and religious role in the community.

It was often believed that the spirits were known as the Gbwéi-gbwéi, who collaborated with the people through the traditional priest to offer household food, such as honey and milk to the Varans, housed in the tower.

The famous military emperor was Rabah, who came from Egypt to Goulfey in an aim to convert locals to Islam and taking slaves. Its weapons used in battles are still present here.

Tourism
Goulfey is a centuries-old dwelling. It is a museum and acts as a cultural centre where young people visit to learn about the rich culture of Kotoko.

See also
Communes of Cameroon

References
 Site de la primature - Élections municipales 2002 
 Contrôle de gestion et performance des services publics communaux des villes camerounaises - Thèse de Donation Avele, Université Montesquieu Bordeaux IV 
 Charles Nanga, La réforme de l’administration territoriale au Cameroun à la lumière de la loi constitutionnelle n° 96/06 du 18 janvier 1996, Mémoire ENA. 

Communes of Far North Region (Cameroon)